Sauli Pietiläinen (born 20 July 1941) is a Finnish footballer. He played in six matches for the Finland national football team in 1961.

References

1941 births
Living people
Finnish footballers
Finland international footballers
Place of birth missing (living people)
Association footballers not categorized by position